Jon Lewis Ford (born August 12, 1976) is an American professional baseball outfielder and hitting coach for the Long Island Ducks of the Atlantic League of Professional Baseball. He played in Major League Baseball (MLB) for the Minnesota Twins and Baltimore Orioles, Nippon Professional Baseball (NPB) for the Hanshin Tigers, the Mexican League for the Guerreros de Oaxaca, and the Atlantic League of Professional Baseball for the Long Island Ducks.

Career
Ford is a 1994 graduate of Port Neches–Groves High School where he played football and baseball and is also a 1999 graduate of Dallas Baptist University. He also played college baseball at Texas A&M University, Seminole State Junior College, and Lee College.

Boston Red Sox
In 1998, Ford was a first team All-American at Dallas Baptist. He set their single school batting record, batting .507 over the course of more than 50 games. In spite of this, Ford was not chosen in the MLB draft. He came back the following year and had another season at Dallas Baptist, after which he was drafted by the Boston Red Sox in the 12th round of the 1999 amateur draft.

In 2000, he played his first full year of Single-A ball for the Augusta Greenjackets of the South Atlantic League. He had a good season, stealing 52 of 56 bases and established the team single-season batting record by hitting .315, adding 74 RBI from the leadoff spot. Baseball America named him as the best defensive outfielder in Class-A and The Sporting News identified him as the Best 5-Tool Prospect in the Red Sox organization. He led all of minor league baseball in runs scored with 122.

Minnesota Twins
On September 9, 2000, Ford was traded to the Minnesota Twins for Héctor Carrasco. He also led all of Minor League Baseball in runs scored in 2002.

He is known for an episode of accidentally burning himself with an hotel iron, which is often erroneously told as a result of the attempted ironing of a shirt while wearing it.

In 2004, he finished tied for 24th in the American League's Most Valuable Player balloting, garnering a total 2 points out of a possible 392.

Ford was named AL Player of the Week for the week ending August 21, 2005. He helped the Twins take three out of four games from the Seattle Mariners after hitting 12-for-33, including 3 home runs, and leading the league in RBI's and runs for that week.

Ford was out-righted to the minor leagues on October 5, 2007, but refused the assignment and became a free agent.

Hanshin Tigers
 
Ford Signed with the Hanshin Tigers in Japan's Nippon Professional Baseball on November 29, 2007.

Colorado Rockies
In March of 2009, Ford signed a minor league contract with the Colorado Rockies, but did not play the season there.

Long Island Ducks/Cincinnati Reds
On August 24, 2009, Ford signed a minor league contract with the Cincinnati Reds. Ford was a member of the Long Island Ducks when he posted 10 home runs, 2 triples, and 55 RBI's in 93 games. The Texas native finished second in the league in batting average (.330) and fourth in on-base percentage (.407). His efforts earned him a contract with the Cincinnati Reds organization.

Guerreros de Oaxaca
Played in (2010) with the Guerreros de Oaxaca of the Mexican League.

Second stint with Long Island Ducks
On March 7, 2011, Ford signed with the Long Island Ducks of the independent Atlantic League.

Baltimore Orioles
On May 19, 2012, Ford signed with the Baltimore Orioles who later that same day sent him down to the Norfolk Tides of Triple-A.

On July 29, 2012 Ford appeared in an MLB lineup for the first time since 2007. He batted fifth and played left field for the Orioles. Ford hit home runs for the Orioles in consecutive games against the Chicago White Sox on August 27–28, 2012. He finished the year hitting .183/.256/.352 with 3 HR's and 4 RBI's in 25 games. On November 2, Ford was out-righted off the 40-man roster and elected free agency four days later. On November 9, Ford signed a minor league contract with the Orioles and was invited to the Oriole's spring training.

Third stint with Long Island Ducks
In August of 2013, Ford was released from the Bowie Baysox, the Orioles Double-A affiliate. He finished the 2013 season playing for the Long Island Ducks of the Atlantic League. Ford stated the 2014 season playing for the Ducks as a starting outfielder.

On October 29, 2014, Ford was named the 2014 Atlantic League Player of the Year. Ford's 2014 season was highlighted by breaking two Atlantic League records. He finished the year with 189 hits, surpassing the previous high of 170 set by Victor Rodriguez (Somerset) in 2004. In addition, Ford became the first player in league history to play in all 140 games during the regular season. Navarrete and Wayne Lydon (Camden) had previously held the record of 139, which was set in 2009. The 38-year old led the Atlantic League in doubles (40) during the 2014 campaign and finished second in batting average (.347), runs batted in (95), runs scored (100), total bases (278), and on-base percentage (.415). Ford earned Atlantic League Player of the Month honors in May after compiling a .402 batting average with 47 hits and a .470 on-base percentage. Two months later, he was selected to play in the Atlantic League All-Star Game at Constellation Field in Sugar Land, Texas. The former big leaguer's defense was also outstanding, as he did not commit a single error in 97 games played in the outfield. He became a free agent after the 2016 season.

On May 28, 2017, Ford re-signed with the Long Island Ducks of the Atlantic League for the 2017 season.

On February 6, 2018, Ford re-signed with the Long Island Ducks for the 2018 season.

On January 15, 2019, Ford re-signed with the Ducks for his 10th season with the club, and his sixth as a player-coach.

On January 30, 2020, Ford re-signed with the Ducks for what would've been his 11th season, and seventh as a player-coach. However, Ford did not play in 2020 due to the cancellation of the 2020 ALPB season because of the COVID-19 pandemic. He became a free agent after the season.

On March 4, 2021, Ford re-signed with the Ducks for his 11th season with the club and seventh as a player-coach. On October 2, Ford collected his 964 career hit for the Ducks, becoming the Ducks' all-time hit leader.

On January 12, 2022, Ford re-signed with the Ducks for his 12th season with the team, and eighth as a player-coach.

On January 31, 2023, Ford re-signed with the Ducks for his 13th season with the club, and ninth season as a player-coach.

References

External links

NPB

1976 births
Living people
American expatriate baseball players in Canada
American expatriate baseball players in Japan
American expatriate baseball players in Mexico
Augusta GreenJackets players
Baseball coaches from Texas
Baseball players from Texas
Baltimore Orioles players
Bowie Baysox players
Caribes de Anzoátegui players
Dallas Baptist Patriots baseball players
Edmonton Trappers players
Fort Myers Miracle players
Gulf Coast Orioles players
Hanshin Tigers players
Long Island Ducks players
Louisville Bats players
Lowell Spinners players
Major League Baseball designated hitters
Major League Baseball outfielders
Mexican League baseball center fielders
Mexican League baseball left fielders
Minnesota Twins players
Navegantes del Magallanes players
American expatriate baseball players in Venezuela
New Britain Rock Cats players
Nippon Professional Baseball outfielders
Norfolk Tides players
Rochester Red Wings players
Sportspeople from Beaumont, Texas
Texas A&M Aggies baseball players
Toros de Tijuana players
Toros del Este players
American expatriate baseball players in the Dominican Republic